Fan Ye (398 – 23 January 446), courtesy name Weizong (蔚宗), was a Chinese historian and politician of the Liu Song dynasty during the Southern and Northern dynasties period. He was the compiler of the historical text Book of the Later Han. The fourth son of Fan Tai (范泰), Fan Ye was born in present-day Shaoxing, Zhejiang, but his ancestral home was in Nanyang, Henan.

He was a noted atheist who heavily criticised Buddhism, Yin and Yang, and the concept of the Mandate of Heaven. To this end, he cited Zhang Heng's scientific studies as evidence.

Fan has a biography in the Book of Song (volume 69).

References

Sources 

 Tan, Jiajian, "Hou Hanshu" ("Book of Later Han"). Encyclopedia of China (Chinese Literature Edition), 1st ed.

Further reading 
 Yap, Joseph P. (2019). The Western Regions, Xiongnu and Han, from the Shiji, Hanshu and Hou Hanshu. .

398 births
445 deaths
5th-century executions
5th-century Chinese historians
Executed Liu Song people
Executed Northern and Southern dynasties people
Historians from Zhejiang
Jin dynasty (266–420) historians
Liu Song historians
Liu Song politicians
People executed by a Northern and Southern dynasties state by decapitation
People executed by Liu Song
Writers from Shaoxing
5th-century Chinese philosophers